Arthur Amos Lloyd (1881–1945) was an English professional footballer who played as a left half in the Football League for Wolverhampton Wanderers. He also played in the Southern League for Brighton & Hove Albion and in other non-league football for Smethwick St Mary's, Oldbury Broadwell, Halesowen and Barrow.

References

1881 births
1945 deaths
Sportspeople from Smethwick
English footballers
Association football wing halves
Halesowen Town F.C. players
Wolverhampton Wanderers F.C. players
Brighton & Hove Albion F.C. players
Barrow A.F.C. players
English Football League players
Southern Football League players